The men's 400 metres at the 2015 World Championships in Athletics was held at the Beijing National Stadium on 23, 24 and 26 August.

Summary
Since 2008, all of the major gold medals had been won by either reigning Olympic champion Kirani James or defending champion LaShawn Merritt.  In the final, both were out ahead, along with Wayde van Niekerk and Isaac Makwala, Africans with none of those credentials.  Through the final turn, van Niekerk took sole possession of the lead, Makwala passed James to hit the home stretch with a slight advantage in second.  Far off the pace was Luguelín Santos.  Down the home stretch, Makwala was unable to hold his position and was passed by a burst from James.  James was unable to hold that burst, Merritt cruised past James but was unable to make any headway on van Niekerk's lead.	
Merritt made a desperate lean that actually cost him time but was well beaten, Santos followed Merritt down the home stretch to take fourth beating the National Record he set in the semi-final round.	
van Niekerk's 43.48 improved upon his own African Record, putting him at number 4 on the all-time list.  For the first time in history, three men broke 44 seconds.  Merritt set the fastest non-winning time of all time at 43.65 seconds.  In fact, places 2, 3 and 4 were all the fastest ever in that position.

Records
Prior to the competition, the records were as follows:

Qualification standards

Schedule

Results

Heats
Qualification: Best 3 (Q) and next 6 fastest (q) qualify for the next round.

Semifinals
Qualification: Best 2 (Q) and next 2 fastest (q) qualify for the next round.

Final
The final was held at 21:25.

References

400
400 metres at the World Athletics Championships